Andrey Rublev defeated Márton Fucsovics in the final, 7–6(7–4), 6–4 to capture the men's singles tennis title at the 2021 Rotterdam Open. It was Rublev's fourth consecutive ATP Tour 500 victory, dating back to the 2020 Hamburg Open.

Gaël Monfils was the two-time defending champion, but chose not to defend his title.

Daniil Medvedev was in contention to become the first player outside of the Big Four to reach the world No. 2 ranking since July 24, 2005 if he reached the final. However, he lost in the first round to Dušan Lajović.

Seeds

Draw

Finals

Top half

Bottom half

Qualifying

Seeds

Qualifiers

Qualifying draw

First qualifier

Second qualifier

Third qualifier

Fourth qualifier

References

External links
 Main draw
 Qualifying draw

2021 ATP Tour
Singles